Obelisks had a prominent role in the architecture and religion of ancient Egypt. This list contains all known remaining ancient Egyptian obelisks. The list does not include modern or pre-modern pseudo-Egyptian obelisks, such as the numerous Egyptian-style obelisks commissioned by Roman Emperors. The list also excludes approximately 40 known obelisk fragments, catalogued by Hiroyuki Nagase and Shoji Okamoto.

Number 

Only about 30 such obelisks are still in existence worldwide; figures vary between sources with different definitions of extant Egyptian obelisks. For example, David Allen states there are 29 such obelisks, with more in Italy than in Egypt. Only two known obelisks date prior to the New Kingdom, both of which were dedicated to the Middle Kingdom Pharaoh Senusret I. At least 22 of the known obelisks date to the New Kingdom, four date to the Late Period and one to the Ptolemaic period.

The international transportation of Egyptian obelisks dates to the Roman conquest of Egypt following the death of Cleopatra, and in modern times to Egyptian gifts to other major cities such as the Luxor Obelisk at the Place de la Concorde in Paris, and the Cleopatra's Needles on the Victoria Embankment and in Central Park in London and New York respectively. Only five obelisks still stand at the ruins of Ancient Egyptian temples.

The largest known obelisk, the unfinished obelisk, was never erected and was discovered in its original quarry.

The most recent ancient obelisk to be re-erected is the 17-metre-tall Ramses II obelisk in Tahrir Square, the main city square of Cairo, having been reassembled from eight blocks discovered at Tanis in the late 19th century. Dr Khaled El-Anany, Egyptian Minister of Tourism and Antiquities, said, "When we go to European capitals like Rome or Paris or London, and also Washington, we see that they use Egyptian obelisks in decorating their major tourist squares, so why do we not do the same?"

List

References

Bibliography

External links
 Peter Lundström, pharaoh.se
 Hiroyuki Nagase and Shoji Okamoto, 2017, Obelisks of the World

Ancient Egyptian obelisks
Ancient Egyptian architecture
Stone monuments and memorials